Leptotes marginalis, the black-bordered zebra blue, is a butterfly in the family Lycaenidae. It is found in Sudan, Uganda, Kenya, the Democratic Republic of the Congo (South Kivu and Lualaba), Rwanda, Burundi, Tanzania and Zambia.

References

Butterflies described in 1944
Leptotes (butterfly)